Plumbatae or martiobarbuli were lead-weighted darts carried by infantrymen in Antiquity and the Middle Ages.

History
 

The first examples seem to have been carried by the Ancient Greeks from about 500 BC onwards, but the best-known users were the late Roman and Eastern Roman armies. The earliest and best written source for these weapons refers to a period around 300 AD, though the document was composed around 390–450 AD.

A second source, also from the late 4th century, is an anonymous treatise titled De rebus bellicis, which briefly discusses (so far archaeologically unattested) spiked plumbatae (plumbata tribolata), but which is also the only source that shows an image of what a plumbata looked like. The image shows what looks like a short arrow with a weight attached to the shaft. Although only later copies of the original manuscript exist, this is confirmed by the remains which have so far turned up in the archaeological record.

A third source is the late 6th century Strategicon, written by the Byzantine emperor Maurice, who wrote about the martzobarboulon, a corruption of its Latin name martiobarbulum.

Plumbatae etymologically contain plumbum, or lead, and can be translated "lead-weighted [darts]". Martiobarbuli in this translation is mattiobarbuli in the Latin, which is most likely an assimilation of Martio-barbuli, "little barbs of Mars". The barb implied a barbed head, and Mars was the god of war (among other things).

Archaeology gives a clearer picture of martiobarbuli. The reference listed has an illustration of a find from Wroxeter identified as the head of a plumbata and a reconstruction of the complete weapon: a fletched dart with an iron head weighted with lead. The reconstruction seems entirely consistent with Vegetius' description.

War darts were also used in Europe later in the Middle Ages.

See also

 Roman military personal equipment
 Lawn darts
 Khuru (sport)

Notes

References

Primary sources
 Anonymous, De Rebus Bellicis: On matters of war.
 Maurice, Strategikon: On Strategy.
 Vegetius, Epitome Rei Militari: Epitome of Military science.

Secondary sources
 Barker, P., The plumbatae from Wroxeter, in: Hassall and Ireland 1979, De Rebus Bellicis, BAR Int. Ser., vol. 63 (Oxford), part 1, pp. 97–9.
 Connolly, Peter, Greece and Rome at War, Greenhill Books, 1998, 
 Degen, R., Plumbatae: Wurfgeschosse der Spätantike, in: Helvetia Archaeologica 1992, vol. 23, pp. 139–147.
 Ireland, Robert, De Rebus Bellicis (anon.), in: BAR International Series 63 (Oxford), part 2.
 Dennis, George T., Maurice's Strategikon. Handbook of Byzantine military strategy, University of Philadelphia Press 1984, .
Keszi, Tamás: Plumbata, the Roman-Style Darts. A Late Antique Weapon from Annamatia. Hungarian Archaeology 2018. Spring, 21-32. https://www.academia.edu/36798885/Plumbata_the_Roman-Style_Darts._A_Late_Antique_Weapon_from_Annamatia
 Milner, N.P., Vegetius: epitome of military science, Liverpool University Press 1993, .
 Völling, T. (1991): Plumbata - Mattiobarbulus - Martzobarboulon? Bemerkungen zu einem Waffenfund aus Olympia in: Archäologischer Anzeiger, pp. 287–98.

External links

 Image of remains of a plumbata
 Vegetius Book I
 Vegetius in translation
 Modern reproduction of a plumbata
 photo of modern Bhutanese style 'Plumbata'

 
Ancient Roman legionary equipment
Throwing weapons
Byzantine military equipment